The Heritage Classic may refer to the following:

A series of NHL outdoor games
NHL Heritage Classic series of outdoor games
2003 Heritage Classic, held in Edmonton
2011 Heritage Classic, held in Calgary
2014 Heritage Classic, held in Vancouver
2016 Heritage Classic, held in Winnipeg
2019 Heritage Classic, held in Regina
2022 Heritage Classic, held in Hamilton
2023 Heritage Classic, to be held in Edmonton

Other uses
The historic name of the PGA Tour golf event now known as The Heritage.
The Heritage Classic motorcycles by Harley-Davidson